The Clement C. Clay Bridge (CC Clay Bridge or Whitesburg Bridge) is a two bridge span over the Tennessee River just south of Huntsville in the northern part of the U.S. state of Alabama. Both bridges are cantilever truss types. The original bridge span was built in 1931, replacing Whites Ferry which crossed the river at nearby Ditto Landing. The second span was constructed in 1965. Upon completion, the newer span carried southbound traffic while the original span carried northbound traffic. The Clay bridge was named after former Alabama Governor and Senator Clement Comer Clay.

The 1931 span was replaced by a reinforced concrete structure, which opened in June 2006. Demolition of the original span began on August 16, 2006.

The bridge carries US-231 and unsigned SR-53 between the Huntsville Metropolitan Area and the Decatur Metropolitan Area. Before the 1952 extension of US-231, the bridge carried SR-38. North of the bridge, US-231 is known as Memorial Parkway.

References

See also
List of crossings of the Tennessee River

Bridges over the Tennessee River
Huntsville-Decatur, AL Combined Statistical Area
Decatur metropolitan area, Alabama
Bridges completed in 1931
Bridges completed in 1965
Bridges completed in 1928
Bridges completed in 2006
Buildings and structures in Huntsville, Alabama
Transportation buildings and structures in Madison County, Alabama
Transportation buildings and structures in Morgan County, Alabama
Road bridges in Alabama
U.S. Route 231
Bridges of the United States Numbered Highway System
1928 establishments in Alabama
Cantilever bridges in the United States
Concrete bridges in the United States